The Oxford Journal of Archaeology is a quarterly peer-reviewed academic journal published by John Wiley & Sons on behalf of the School of Archaeology, University of Oxford. It was established in 1982 and the editors-in-chief are Nicholas Purcell, Barry Cunliffe, Helena Hamerow, and Chris Gosden (University of Oxford).

Abstracting and indexing 
The journal is abstracted and indexed in:

External links 

 

Archaeology journals
Publications established in 1982
English-language journals
Wiley (publisher) academic journals
Quarterly journals
1982 establishments in England